Atlanta Independent School District is a public school district based in Atlanta, Texas (USA). In addition to Atlanta, the district also serves the town of Douglassville. The district operates one high school, Atlanta High School.

Finances
As of the 2010–2011 school year, the appraised valuation of property in the district was $537,222,000. The maintenance tax rate was $0.104 and the bond tax rate was $0.015 per $100 of appraised valuation.

Academic achievement
In 2011, the school district was rated "academically acceptable" by the Texas Education Agency.  Forty-nine percent of districts in Texas in 2011 received the same rating. No state accountability ratings will be given to districts in 2012. A school district in Texas can receive one of four possible rankings from the Texas Education Agency: Exemplary (the highest possible ranking), Recognized, Academically Acceptable, and Academically Unacceptable (the lowest possible ranking).

Historical district TEA accountability ratings
2011: Academically Acceptable
2010: Recognized
2009: Academically Acceptable
2008: Academically Acceptable
2007: Academically Acceptable
2006: Academically Acceptable
2005: Academically Acceptable
2004: Academically Acceptable

Schools
In the 2011–2012 school year, the district had students in five schools. 
Regular instructional
Atlanta High School (9th- 12th grade)
Atlanta Middle School (6th- 8th grade)
Atlanta Elementary School (3rd- 5th grade)
Atlanta Primary School (Kindergarten- 2nd grade)
DAEP instructional
Corrective Behavior Center (Grades 5-12)

See also

List of school districts in Texas
List of high schools in Texas

References

External links

School districts in Cass County, Texas